Sleeping Patterns is the third studio EP from the American rock band Toy Cars.

Content
The five-track EP was released on 16 November 2016 on compact disc, tape and vinyl with Sniffling Indie Kids and Counter Intuitive Records. It was engineered and produced by Erik Kase Romero, at Lakehouse Recording Studios in Asbury Park, New Jersey, mixed by Tim Pannella and Kase Romero, and mastered by Pannella. Album artwork is by Alex Brown Creative. A Pirate! press release describes Sleeping Patterns as "music that makes you feel alive because the only way to feel sadness in such depths is to have known a joy in equal measure," and the EP draws comparison to the music of Preoccupations, Titus Andronicus, Desaparecidos, and Against Me!. The opening track and lead single "Bjork" is a tongue-in-cheek tribute to the Icelandic alt-rock icon. For the fourth song "Stone," Toy Cars explains that it was "originally a track that we didn't think would end up on this record [but] it ended up becoming one of our favorites, both to play live and to record."

Reception
Substream Magazine describes Sleeping Patterns as "energetic rock with hints of pop-punk, emo, and Americana all woven into a tidy little mix that should appeal to fans of everything from Moose Blood, to the Gaslight Anthem, to Arcade Fire." Bob Makin in Courier News says that the "five-track release is another great production from the dynamic team at Asbury Park's Lakehouse Recording Studios," and WMCX calls Sleeping Pattern "one hell of a record." Consequence of Sound editor Alex Gailbrath says the song "Stone" is a "propulsive monster of a track with catchy turns of phrase that wouldn't seem out of place scrawled on the front of a notebook."

Track listing

Personnel
Chris Beninato – bass
Matt Caponegro – guitar and vocals
Matteo DeBenedetti – vocals and guitar
Mike Linardi – drums and vocals

References
Citations

Bibliography

External links

2016 EPs
Indie rock EPs
Toy Cars (band) albums
Sniffling Indie Kids albums
Counter Intuitive Records albums